"Just a Touch of Love"  is a song written by Robert Clivillés and performed by American musical group C+C Music Factory. Also known as "Just a Touch of Love (Everyday)", it was released in August 1991 as the duo's fourth single from their debut album, Gonna Make You Sweat (1990). It became their fourth number one on the US Billboard Hot Dance Club Play chart. On other US charts, the song went to #50 on the Billboard Hot 100 and #83 on the Billboard soul singles chart.

Critical reception
Jose F. Promis from AllMusic described "Just a Touch of Love" as "a sleek, elegant, straight-up house jam sans rap". Clark and DeVaney from Cashbox stated that it "has the commercial/dance sound that is in much demand and has already been proven to be successful." Pan-European magazine Music & Media commented, "More dance from American groove masters C&C. Just a touch of rap and a little bit of scratching are covered in soulful and meaty vocals. Slightly reminiscent of the '70s, there are echoes of Chic, among others." Marc Andrews from Smash Hits wrote, "Here the C&Cs shamelessly steal large portions from Mads' most brilliant effort ["Vogue"] but most significantly, Freedom Williams doesn't even get a rap look-in. There's just Zelma with her dangerously over-ironed tresses screeching her lungs out."

Charts

Song in popular culture
"Just a Touch of Love" was featured in the 1992 film Sister Act and in the second season of the 2018 television series Pose.

See also
 List of number-one dance singles of 1992 (U.S.)

References

1991 singles
1991 songs
Songs written by Robert Clivillés